The Daytime Emmy Award for Outstanding Younger Performer in a Drama Series is an award presented annually by the National Academy of Television Arts and Sciences (NATAS) and the Academy of Television Arts & Sciences (ATAS). It was first awarded at the 47th Daytime Emmy Awards in 2020, and it is given annually to honor a young actress or actor below the age of 21, who has delivered an outstanding performance in a role while working within the daytime drama industry.

Prior to this category's introduction, the awards were distributed on the basis of gender, in the respective, Outstanding Younger Actor in a Drama Series and Outstanding Younger Actress in a Drama Series categories. An announcement was made to merge in October 2019, and introduce this current single, gender-neutral one. Reasons for such change, included that there are fewer daytime soap operas, thus less number of entrants as well as part as the continuous discussion and implementation of gender-inclusive categories at award competitions. In spite of that, only female-identifying actors earned a nomination in the category in the first year the award was merged.

It was announced that for the 48th Daytime Emmy Awards competition, it would be the final year in which the age 25 is the cut-off. It was then lowered that following year to 21, and lowered further to 18 for 2023. Additionally, Younger Performer entrants are permitted to enter this category an infinite number of times, while they are under 18, but once they turn 18, they are permitted to enter only three times before being moved to either Lead or Supporting. Being age-qualified to enter Younger does NOT mean an entrant is required to. Lead and Supporting acting categories are also open to performers under the age of 25. It would be up to the discretion of the actor.

The award was first presented to Olivia Rose Keegan, for her role as Claire Brady on Days of Our Lives.  As of the 2022 ceremony, Nicholas Chavez is the most recent winner in this category. Katelyn MacMullen, Alyvia Alyn Lind and Sydney Mikayla have the most nominations in this category, with a total of two.

Winners and nominees
Listed below are the winners of the award for each year, as well as the other nominees.

Multiple nominations
2 nominations
Alyvia Alyn Lind
Katelyn MacMullen
Sydney Mikayla

References

External links
 Daytime Emmy Awards at the Internet Movie Database

Daytime Emmy Awards